Zsolt Sebők (born 3 April 1979) is a retired Hungarian football goalkeeper. He formerly played for Győri ETO FC and Videoton FC.

External links
 Profile
 

1979 births
Living people
Hungarian footballers
Association football goalkeepers
Győri ETO FC players
Fehérvár FC players
AEP Paphos FC players
Pafos FC players
Gyirmót FC Győr players
Nemzeti Bajnokság I players
Cypriot First Division players
Cypriot Second Division players
Hungarian expatriate footballers
Expatriate footballers in Cyprus
Sportspeople from Győr